Napin is one of the two most abundant seed storage proteins in the seeds of dicot crop mustard and rapeseed (Brassica napus L., B. juncea L. Czern., B. nigra L. W.D.J.Koch, B. rapa L. and Sinapis alba L.). They are water soluble low-molecular weight basic proteins classified as 2S or 1.7S proteins, representing 20–40% of total seed protein, and having a molecular weight in the range of 12–17 kDa. Their isoelectric point varies based on the method of extraction and the specific characteristics of the isoforms that exist. They are composed of two polypeptide chains, a 4.5 kDa small subunit and a large 10 kDa subunit, stabilized primarily by disulphide bonds. Their secondary structure shows a high α-helical content.

Properties 
Arginine, lysine, and cysteine make napines excellent antibacterials, and since it's a basic protein, it can change its acidity to make it more effective. Some in silico and in vitro antimicrobial activity screening reported napins as antimicrobial and antifungal peptides.

Structure 
As a basic protein, napin can be used to bind together and determine the shape, properties, and be able to synthesize when seeds develop.

Composition 
In terms of molecular weights, napin polypeptide chains are made up of 9,900 and 4,000 amino acids held together by disulfide bonds .The amino acid sequence of napin cDNA clones and napin peptide fragments indicate napin starts as a 178-residue precursor.

Solubility 
Napin is water soluble and soluble in a wide pH range.

References

Seed storage proteins